Philip Turner (born 12 February 1962) is an English retired footballer.

Turner, a central midfielder, began his career at Lincoln City with whom he won promotion to the Third Division in 1981 under Colin Murphy, and formed midfield partnerships with Glenn Cockerill and then Neil Redfearn before joining Grimsby Town in 1986. In May 1985 he was to witness a nightmare when 56 spectators were killed in a horrendous stand fire while playing Bradford City. A brief spell at Leicester City followed before he joined Notts County in 1989. He would become a stalwart of the Magpies side, winning back-to-back promotions in 1990 and 1991, and remained at the club until his professional retirement in 1996. Turner made one final appearance as a substitute for Grantham Town on the opening day of the 2004/05 season.

References

External links
Career Stats

Living people
1962 births
English footballers
Lincoln City F.C. players
Grimsby Town F.C. players
Leicester City F.C. players
Notts County F.C. players
English Football League players
Association football midfielders
Footballers from Sheffield